Adam Bouzid (born 30 November 1987) is a French former professional footballer who played as a midfielder. He is the younger brother of Algeria international player Ismaël Bouzid.

Career

Youth career
Bouzid began his playing career in the junior ranks of FC Metz and of LB Châteauroux. He then played in the junior ranks of a number of clubs in France and Germany: FC Metz, FSV Oggersheim, Wormatia Worms, 1899 Hoffenheim II and ES Troyes.

Mouloudia Oujda
Bouzid spent the 2009–10 season with Mouloudia Oujda in the Moroccan Botola 2.

Southend United
In August 2010, Bouzid moved to England to sign with Southend United of League Two, as one of seventeen new signings. This move came despite difficulties in securing his transfer from the Moroccan club, after delays in getting the necessary paperwork from the Moroccan government. He made his debut for the club in the Football League Trophy in their goalless First Round encounter with Gillingham at Roots Hall, he was replaced by Louie Soares at half-time before Southend went on to win 4–3 on penalties. On 26 October 2010, Bouzid suffered a head injury in a reserve team game against Colchester United which required emergency surgery to his skull. On 14 January 2011, Bouzid went on a week-long trial with Scottish club Ross County. However, he did not do enough to impress manager Willie McStay and returned to Southend. In May 2011 he was one of five players told they were to be released by Southend.

References

External links
 
 
 
 https://web.archive.org/web/20120627031133/http://www.leaderfoot.com/5934-interview-adam-bouzidmon-travail-a-ete-recompense-et-je-resterai-a-el-eulma/

1987 births
Living people
French sportspeople of Algerian descent
Sportspeople from Nancy, France
Footballers from Grand Est
French footballers
Association football midfielders
Algerian Ligue Professionnelle 1 players
Regionalliga players
Luxembourg National Division players
FC Metz players
FSV Oggersheim players
Wormatia Worms players
TSG 1899 Hoffenheim II players
MC Oujda players
Southend United F.C. players
MC El Eulma players
SVN Zweibrücken players
FK Pirmasens players
SV Eintracht Trier 05 players
FC Etzella Ettelbruck players
French expatriate footballers
Expatriate footballers in Algeria
French expatriate sportspeople in Algeria
French expatriate sportspeople in Germany
Expatriate footballers in Germany
French expatriate sportspeople in Morocco
Expatriate footballers in Morocco
French expatriate sportspeople in England
Expatriate footballers in England
French expatriate sportspeople in Luxembourg
Expatriate footballers in Luxembourg